Luís Viana Filho, in old spelling Luiz Vianna Filho (28 March 1908 – 5 June 1990), was a Brazilian lawyer, professor, historian and politician who governed the state Bahia from 1967 to 1971.

Biography 
Luís Viana Filho was born in Paris, France, and his birth certificate was registered in Salvador, Brazil. He was the son of the last governor of Bahia in the 19th century, Luís Viana. He graduated in law in 1929, but exercised the profession of journalist, corresponding to the newspapers in the Bahian capital "Diário da Bahia" and "A Tarde".

In 1934 he entered politics, being elected federal deputy, being removed due to the coup of the Estado Novo, which returned him to journalism. One of the founders of the PSD, he was re-elected to the same post, after the end of the Vargas Era, in 1945, in successive terms until 1966, when he became incompatible to run for the state government – in an election along the lines of the Military Regime, whose installation in the country he had supported – having been, since 1964, Extraordinary Minister for Affairs of the Civil Cabinet of the exception regime.

On 3 September 1966, he was elected, indirectly, by the Legislative Assembly, taking office the following year.

Professor of Private International Law and History of Brazil at the Federal University of Bahia. As a historian, he published some books.

He was a member of the Historical and Geographic Institute of Bahia; the Academia de Letras da Bahia; meritorious member of the Brazilian Historical and Geographic Institute; corresponding member of the International Academy of Portuguese Culture, the Academy of Sciences of Lisbon and the Portuguese Academy of History.

After the period of government, already by the Arena, he was elected to the Senate, where he chaired the Foreign Relations Commission and the Federal Senate itself, in the 1979–80 biennium. He died in 1990, when he was serving his second term as a senator, having also integrated the PDS and PMDB.

Luís Viana Filho was the only person to integrate all three Constituent Assemblies of the 20th Century (1934, 1946 and 1987–88).

Government of Bahia 
As part of the period known as "Brazilian Miracle", marked by strong industrialization and exacerbated external indebtedness, Luís Viana Filho begins the construction of the industrial park in Bahia, in Aratu, revolving around the petrochemical industry (CIA – Centro Industrial de Aratu).

In the inaugural speech he says his government is based on the trinomial "Order, Work and Morality". It promotes some reforms in teaching, but, always focused on the construction of classrooms and not on the effective preparation of the teaching profession, since its government the State witnessed the decline of the quality of public education, a process led by the regime to which it was affiliated.

In her government she received a visit from Queen Elizabeth II of the United Kingdom.

Brazilian Academy of Letters 
He was elected to the Academy on 8 April 1954, the third member of Chair 22, whose patron is José Bonifacio. He took office on 15 April of the following year, received by Menotti Del Picchia.

Decorations 
Grand Cross of the Order of Ipiranga of the Brazilian state of São Paulo;
Grand Cross of the Military Order of Christ of Portugal (17 January 1966);
Grand Officer of the Military Order of Torre e Espada, of Valor, Loyalty and Merit of Portugal (February 26, 1971);
Grand Cross of the Order of Merit of Portugal (September 22, 1981);

Grand Cross of the Order of Infante D. Henrique de Portugal (July 14, 1986);
Grand Cross of the Order of Public Instruction of Portugal (November 26, 1987).

References 

1908 births
1990 deaths